This is a list of seasons played by Hapoel Ironi Kiryat Shmona F.C. in Israeli and European football, from 2000 (when the club was created following a merger between Hapoel Kiryat Shmona and Maccabi Kiryat Shmona) to the most recent completed season. It details the club's achievements in major competitions, and the top scorers for each season. Top scorers in bold were also the top scorers in the Israeli league that season.

The club has won the League Championship once, the State Cup once, the Toto Cup twice (as well as two Second Division Toto Cup) and the Super Cup once.

History
Ironi Kiryat Shmona was created in 2000 with a merger between two rival Kiryat Shmona clubs, Hapoel and Maccabi. The merged club played in fourth tier Liga Alef for the 2000–01 season, winning the division and gaining promotion to Liga Artzit. The club first promoted to the top division in 2007, after winning Liga Leumit. In 2011–12 the club won the championship.

Seasons

Key

 P = Played
 W = Games won
 D = Games drawn
 L = Games lost
 F = Goals for
 A = Goals against
 Pts = Points
 Pos = Final position

 Premier = Israeli Premier League
 Leumit = Liga Leumit (National League)
 Artzit = Liga Artzit (Nationwide League)
 Alef = Liga Alef

 F = Final
 RU = runners-up
 SF = Semi-finals
 QF = Quarter-finals
 GS = Group stage
 PORT = Play-Off round
 1QR = First Qualifying Round
 2QR = Second Qualifying Round
 3QR = Third Qualifying Round
 4QR = Fourth Qualifying Round

 R6 = Round 6
 R7 = Round 7
 R8 = Round 8
 R9 = Round 9

Notes and references

Hapoel Ironi Kiryat Shmona F.C.
Hapoel Ironi Kiryat Shmona F.C. seasons
Hapoel Ironi Kiryat Shmona